The rectovesical pouch is the pocket that lies between the rectum and the bladder in males in humans and other mammals. It is lined by peritoneum.

Structure 
The rectovesical pouch is a space between the rectum and the bladder in men. It lies above the seminal vesicles. It is lined by peritoneum and at its base is the rectoprostatic fascia (Denonvillier's fascia). When a man is upright or supine, it is the lowest part of his peritoneal cavity. It may contain parts of the ileum (lower small intestine) and the sigmoid colon.

In women, the uterus lies between the rectum and the bladder. Therefore, women do not have a rectovesical pouch, but instead have a rectouterine pouch and vesicouterine pouch. After a hysterectomy in women, the remaining peritoneum may be referred to as a rectovesical pouch.

Clinical significance 
When a man is upright or supine, the rectovesical pouch is the lowest part of his peritoneal cavity. Because of this, peritoneal fluid and other fluids that enter the peritoneal cavity, including ascites, blood and pus, tend to collect in this pouch.

Additional images

See also 
 Vesicouterine pouch
 Rectouterine pouch (Pouch of Douglas)

References 

Pelvis